Algarrobina is a syrup made from the Black Carob tree. It is popular in Peruvian cuisine and can be used in smoothies, cocktails, or simply in milk. Black Carob is a tree indigenous to Coastal Peru; rich in natural sugars, vitamins and minerals, it's a good substitute for chocolate. It can be found in health food stores in the U.S.

References

External links

Peruvian cuisine
Sugar substitutes
Syrup